TCP Software (TimeClock Plus, LLC) is a cloud-based time and attendance workforce management system founded in 1988 to serve the time tracking needs in the restaurant industry. Developed as a DOS application, the system developed into a Windows application, and ultimately into a web application. The software is available under a perpetual license or a SaaS (Software as a service) and serves approximately 30,000 customers with millions of users in both the public and private sectors.

TCP meets the needs of its customers by providing workforce management software and hardware designed to help administrators track employees, manage labor costs and reduce compliance risk. TCP’s software includes Time & Attendance, Leave Management, Document Management, Advanced and Dynamic Scheduling and more, all of which integrate with major payroll and ERP/HCM systems. TCP also has an extensive array of time collection devices including biometric badge readers and an award-winning temperature reader (Thermal Sensor). The core Time Clock easily mounts to a wall and is highly configurable with multiple input methods including a touch screen and touchless options. The MobileClock app and WebClock application make it easy for employees to clock in and out while data is immediately recorded in a Microsoft SQL database. TimeClock Manager is a web application for administrators to review hours, enter leave, run reports, and send hours to payroll.

History
TCP Software (TimeClock Plus, LLC) was developed in 1988 and known as Data Management Inc. (DMI), which later became known as TimeClock Plus, LLC. To better prepare for growth through acquisition, the company name changed again with a rebrand in 2020. The software was originally written in DOS and several versions were released up to 1994, with one in 1999 to fix the year 2000 problem. Versions were also written for SCO UNIX and IBM AIX. The first version for Microsoft Windows was released in 1994.

Until 2005, the software used a Dbase compatible database, but from version 5.0, it changed to Microsoft SQL. In 2006 the first web version was released as a simple, scaled down version of 5.0 for Windows. This removed the necessity of a client installation and also made the system available to Macintosh users for the first time. In 2008 a complete web version of 5.0 for Windows was introduced.

In 2010 web version 3.0 was released with all the functionality of 6.0 for Windows. Later, TimeClock Plus Hybrid was released, which allowed 3.0 for Web and 6.0 for Windows to operate together. This was followed by the SaaS model, TimeClock Plus OnDemand, which allows subscribers to use the application on a database hosted by Data Management Inc. at a SAS 70 compliant data center with encrypted data transmission and daily backups. Two new employee access points were introduced in 2011: an interactive voice response system and mobile applications that run on Android and iPhone.

In August 2011 a partnership was announced between TimeClock Plus and Windsor Management Group, which services "850+ school districts" around the country, to bundle TimeClock Plus with the financial and HR management solution, Infinite Visions. In September the same year, TimeClock Plus announced that it had formed a partnership with the Texas Computer Cooperative (TCC) which provides administrative software to Texas schools,

In 2019, TimeClock Plus, LLC was acquired by a Providence Equity Partners and the company rebranded to TCP Software for marketing purposes (the legal name remains TimeClock Plus, LLC). Today, TCP provides time tracking, scheduling, leave management, document management, data analytics and reporting software, a highly configurable time clock collection, and an ability to integrate into payroll and ERP/HCM providers.

Features
The TimeClock Plus v7 software includes several web applications.

The administrative application is TimeClock Manager where employees, managers, job codes, and business rules are created and maintained. Important information is reflected on the dashboard in interactive widgets. Tools are available to manage hours and leave requests, generate a report, determine job code status, and total hours for the day or week to prevent unnecessary overtime, send employee messages, build schedules, and track tips for service industries. The reports break down employee time, job codes, and other information in different ways.

WebClock is the interface used by employees to clock in, clock out, go on break, change job code, and carry out other enabled tasks such as viewing and approving hours, viewing schedules, and entering time sheets or leave requests. Missed punches may also be enabled to save time when an employee forgets to clock in or out. Hardware is also available for clock operations involving a terminal that can be mounted on the wall, which is configured and controlled by another web application called Clock Hub.

Another web application is TimeClock Scheduler where schedules are created and maintained.

There are also over 100 payroll interface modules that can transfer hours to payroll systems.

Reception
In 1992, the New York Times wrote that "Unlike many flashy software products, Timeclock Plus works just fine on older PC-XT's" and it can "streamline paperwork and provide managers with a handy tool for analyzing labor costs." In the same year, the Miami Herald wrote that "TimeClock Plus will maintain the records of as many as 10,000 employees."

In April 2011, the San Angelo Standard Times reported that TimeClock Plus scales to any size from small family owned shops to large companies like NASA and that about 50,000 companies were using the system including Boeing, Harley Davidson, Ford Motor Company, Dial, and Sara Lee.

See also
NETtime Solutions
Redcort Software
Time clock
Timesheet

References

Business software